Varniab (also Romanized as Varnīāb and Varnīyāb; also known as Vīāt) is a village in the Central District of Sareyn County, Ardabil Province, Iran. At the 2006 census, its population was 215 in 47 families.

References 

Tageo

Towns and villages in Sareyn County